Maduropeptin consists of a 1:1 complex of a carrier protein (MdpA) and a chromophore isolated from Actinomadura madurae. The chromophore has an enediyne structure and is an antibiotic with anticancer activity.

References

External links
 Maduropeptin chromophore at ChemSpider

Antibiotics
Enediynes
Nine-membered rings